Carolina García Cañón (born 30 January 1981) is a Mexican politician from the Ecologist Green Party of Mexico. From 2009 to 2010 she served as Deputy of the LXI Legislature of the Mexican Congress representing the State of Mexico.

References

1981 births
Living people
Politicians from the State of Mexico
Women members of the Chamber of Deputies (Mexico)
Ecologist Green Party of Mexico politicians
21st-century Mexican politicians
21st-century Mexican women politicians
Deputies of the LXI Legislature of Mexico
Members of the Chamber of Deputies (Mexico) for the State of Mexico